Marcelo Mena Carrasco (born 20 March 1975) is a Chilean biochemical engineer and politician.

He was minister of the second government of Michelle Bachelet (2014−2018).

References

External links
 

1975 births
Chilean people
Pontifical Catholic University of Valparaíso alumni
Iowa State University alumni
21st-century Chilean politicians
Living people